The Estadio Ciudad de Puertollano is a multi-use stadium located in Puertollano, Castile-La Mancha, Spain. 
It is currently used for football matches and is the home stadium of CD Puertollano.

The stadium inauguration saw CD Puertollano draw 2-2 with Sevilla Atletico on 21 November 2010. Built by the municipality at a cost of € 7 million, the new arena has an all seated capacity of 7,240, arranged on three open banks of blue and white seating and a large covered main stand to the north side of the stadium. This stand also features 17 private boxes, modern media facilities, changing rooms and an indoor warm-up area for the players. The development is complete with an artificial training pitch behind the southern bank of seating.

References

External links
Estadios de Espana 
CD Puertollano profile on Futbolme 

Football venues in Castilla–La Mancha
CD Puertollano
Buildings and structures in the Province of Ciudad Real
Sports venues completed in 2010
Puertollano